Bharse  is a village and municipality in Gulmi District in the Lumbini Zone of central Nepal. At the time of the 2011 Nepal census it had a population of 1621 people living in 420 individual households. It has contributed many personnels for the British and Indian army.

References

External links
UN map of the municipalities of Gulmi District

Populated places in Gulmi District